Thomas Girod (born 6 June 1983) is a French luger who has competed since 1997. His best finish at the FIL World Luge Championships was 23rd in the men's singles event at Oberhof in 2008.

Girod's best finish at the FIL European Luge Championships was 17th in the men's singles event at Sigulda in 2010.

He qualified for the 2010 Winter Olympics, the first for France since the 2002 Winter Olympics. Girod finished 22nd.

References
 FIL-Luge profile

External links
 

1983 births
Living people
French male lugers
Olympic lugers of France
Lugers at the 2010 Winter Olympics